Benjamin Gavanon (born 9 August 1980) is a French former professional footballer who played as a central midfielder.

Career
Born in a suburb of Marseille, Gavanon started his career at his local club, Olympique de Marseille. However, Gavanon found it difficult to break into the Marseille first team, and played a total of seven minutes in six years as a professional at the club.

At the end of his time at Marseille, Gavanon spent a spell on loan at English club Nottingham Forest, then in the second tier of English football.  However, Gavanon failed to break into the Forest first team and returned to France.

On his return, in the summer of 2003, Gavanon found himself unwanted, and his contract was terminated.  He then signed a two-year contract with Ligue 2 club Nancy, and after impressing, earned himself a two-year extension, keeping him at the club until 2007.

After Nancy's promotion in 2005, Gavanon began to struggle with Ligue 1 football, but worked hard to regain his place towards the end of the season.  He became a regular as Nancy continued in the top flight.

On 29 February 2012, China League One club Shenzhen Ruby announced that Gavanon had signed a two-year contract with the club.

References

External links
 
 

1980 births
Living people
Footballers from Marseille
French footballers
Association football midfielders
Olympique de Marseille players
Nottingham Forest F.C. players
AS Nancy Lorraine players
FC Sochaux-Montbéliard players
Amiens SC players
Shenzhen F.C. players
Ligue 1 players
English Football League players
Ligue 2 players
China League One players
French expatriate footballers
Expatriate footballers in England
Expatriate footballers in China